Tripdiolide is an anti-inflammatory isolate of Tripterygium wilfordii.

References

Diterpenes
Furanones
Epoxides